The 1949 San Diego State Aztecs football team represented San Diego State College during the 1949 college football season.

San Diego State competed in the California Collegiate Athletic Association (CCAA). The team was led by third-year head coach Bill Schutte, and played home games at both Aztec Bowl and Balboa Stadium. They finished the season with six wins and three losses (6–3, 3–1 CCAA). Overall, the team was outscored by its opponents 195–200 for the season.

Schedule

Team players in the NFL
No San Diego State players were selected in the 1950 NFL Draft.

The following finished their San Diego State career in 1949, were not drafted, but played in the NFL.

Notes

References

San Diego State
San Diego State Aztecs football seasons
San Diego State Aztecs football